STS-7 was NASA's seventh Space Shuttle mission, and the second mission for the Space Shuttle Challenger. During the mission, Challenger deployed several satellites into orbit. The shuttle launched from Kennedy Space Center on June 18, 1983, and landed at Edwards Air Force Base on June 24, 1983. STS-7 carried Sally Ride, America's first female astronaut.

Crew

Support crew 
 John E. Blaha
 Roy D. Bridges Jr. (ascent CAPCOM)
 Guy Gardner
 Terry Hart
 Jon McBride
 Bryan D. O'Connor (entry CAPCOM)

Crew seat assignments

Mission summary 
STS-7 began on June 18, 1983, with an on-time liftoff at 07:33:00 a.m.EDT. It was the first spaceflight of an American woman (Ride), the largest crew to fly in a single spacecraft up to that time (five people), and the first flight that included members of NASA's Group 8 astronaut class, which had been selected in 1978 to fly the Space Shuttle. President Ronald Reagan also sent his personal favorite Jelly Belly jelly beans with the astronauts, making them the first jelly beans in space. The crew had already ate lunch with the president at the White House on June 1, the first time that a crew did so before launch rather than after.

The crew of STS-7 included Robert Crippen, commander, making his second Shuttle flight; Frederick Hauck, pilot; and Sally Ride, John M. Fabian and Norman Thagard, all mission specialists. Thagard conducted medical tests concerning Space adaptation syndrome, a bout of nausea frequently experienced by astronauts during the early phase of a space flight.

Two communications satellites – Anik C2 for Telesat of Canada, and Palapa B1 for Indonesia – were successfully deployed during the first two days of the mission; both were Hughes-built HS-376-series satellites. The mission also carried the first Shuttle pallet satellite (SPAS-1), which was built by the West German aerospace firm Messerschmitt-Bölkow-Blohm (MBB). SPAS-1 was unique in that it was designed to operate in the payload bay or be deployed by the Remote Manipulator System (Canadarm) as a free-flying satellite. It carried 10 experiments to study formation of metal alloys in microgravity, the operation of heat pipes, instruments for remote sensing observations, and a mass spectrometer to identify various gases in the payload bay. It was deployed by the Canadarm and flew alongside and over Challenger for several hours, performing various maneuvers, while a U.S.-supplied camera mounted on SPAS-1 took pictures of the orbiter. The Canadarm later grappled the pallet and returned it to the payload bay.

STS-7 also carried seven Getaway Special (GAS) canisters, which contained a wide variety of experiments, as well as the OSTA-2 payload, a joint U.S.-West Germany scientific pallet payload. Finally, the orbiter's Ku-band antenna was able to relay data through the U.S. tracking and data relay satellite (TDRS) to a ground terminal for the first time.

STS-7 was scheduled to make the first orbiter landing at Kennedy Space Center's then-new Shuttle Landing Facility (SLF). Unacceptable weather forced a change to Runway15 at Edwards Air Force Base. The landing took place on June 24, 1983, at 06:56:59a.m. PDT. The mission lasted 6days, 2hours, 23minutes, and 59seconds, and covered about  during 97orbits of the Earth. Challenger was returned to KSC on June 29, 1983.

Incidents 

STS-7 experienced the first known Space Shuttle external tank (ET) bipod ramp foam shedding event during launch. This was the root cause of the eventual loss of Columbia during STS-107 almost two decades later. While Challenger was on-orbit, one of its windows was damaged non-critically by space debris.

Mission insignia 
The seven white stars in the black field of the mission patch, as well as the arm extending from the orbiter in the shape of a 7, indicate the flight's numerical designation in the Space Transportation System's mission sequence. The five-armed symbol on the right side illustrates the four male/one female crew.

Wake-up calls 
NASA began a tradition of playing music to astronauts during the Project Gemini, and first used music to wake up a flight crew during Apollo 15. Each track is specially chosen, often by the astronauts' families, and usually has a special meaning to an individual member of the crew, or is applicable to their daily activities.

Gallery

See also 

 List of human spaceflights
 List of Space Shuttle missions

References

External links 
 STS-7 mission summary NASA
 STS-7 video highlights NSS
 Interview with Sally Ride and STS-7 mission footage Texas Archive of the Moving Image

Space Shuttle missions
Edwards Air Force Base
1983 in Florida
1983 in California
Spacecraft launched in 1983
Spacecraft which reentered in 1983
June 1983 events
Sally Ride